Dvorec is a village and municipality in Bánovce nad Bebravou District in the Trenčín Region of north-western Slovakia.

History
In historical records the village was first mentioned in 1455.

Geography
The municipality lies at an altitude of 210 metres and covers an area of 2.659 km². It has a population of about 425 people.

Genealogical resources

The records for genealogical research are available at the state archive "Statny Archiv in Bratislava, Slovakia"

 Roman Catholic church records (births/marriages/deaths): 1705-1896 (parish B)

See also
 List of municipalities and towns in Slovakia

External links
 Official page
https://web.archive.org/web/20071217080336/http://www.statistics.sk/mosmis/eng/run.html
Surnames of living people in Dvorec

Villages and municipalities in Bánovce nad Bebravou District